Madame Foo-Foo is an album by American jazz vocalist Dakota Staton recorded in 1972 and released on the Groove Merchant label.

Reception 

Allmusic's Jason Ankeny said: "Recorded with soul-jazz icon Richard "Groove" Holmes on Hammond, Madame Foo Foo not only boasts a hip, contemporary sound unlike any of Staton's previous efforts, but it's an approach that fits the singer like a glove, accentuating the earthy, blues-inspired elements so vital to her craft. ... the session settles into a sinuous, late-night groove that complements the far-ranging material in full. Silent for so long, Staton clearly savors every nuance and turn of phrase, delivering one of her finest and most impassioned performances".

Track listing
 "Let It Be Me" (Gilbert Bécaud, Pierre Delanoë, Manny Curtis) – 4:17
 "Congratulations to Someone" (Roy Alfred, Al Frisch) – 4:43
 "Let Me Off Uptown" (Earl Bostic, Redd Evans) – 2:43
 "A House Is Not a Home" (Burt Bacharach, Hal David) – 3:33
 "Blues for Tasty" (Dakota Staton) – 4:08
 "A Losing Battle" (Mac Rebennack, Leonard Dauenhauer) – 3:30
 "Deep in a Dream" (Jimmy Van Heusen, Eddie DeLange) – 2:28
 "Confessin' the Blues" (Jay McShann, Walter Brown) – 3:59
 "Candy" (Alex Kramer, Mack David, Joan Whitney) – 3:15
 "Moonglow" (Will Hudson, Irving Mills, DeLange) – 3:20

Personnel
Dakota Staton − vocals
Groove Holmes – organ
Horace Ott – electric piano
Cornell Dupree (tracks 1–3, 5–8), Lloyd Davis (tracks 4, 9 & 10) – guitar 
Paul Martinez – bass
Bernard Purdie – drums
Kwasi Jayourba – congas, bongos

References

Groove Merchant albums
Dakota Staton albums
1972 albums
Albums produced by Sonny Lester